But You Were Dead is a 1966 Italian film directed, produced, shot and edited by Gianni Vernuccio.

Plot
After his parents are killed in a car accident, Giovanni Bernardi visits his grandfather, Count Marco Anselmi. While staying at the old man's villa, he sees a ghost-like girl named Veronique. Giovanni learns that she died in World War I but her spirit still wanders the grounds and haunts the living.

Cast
 Alba Rigazzi
 Cristina Gaioni
 Alex Morrison
 Antonio Bellani
 Walter Pozzi
 Jeanine Falconi

Production
But You Were Dead was funded by the small Milan-based company Mercurfin and was shot entirely in Lombardy. Italian film historian Roberto Curti stated that although the film was marketed as a horror film, it was more of a "supernatural melodrama"

Release
But You Were Dead was distributed theatrically in Italy by Mercurfin on 1 October 1966. The film grossed a total of 61 million Italian lire domestically. It was released on VHS in Italy by Cosmo Video. The film was released in the United Kingdom with the title But You Were Dead.

Reception
In a contemporary review, the Monthly Film Bulletin declared the film to be "singularly tedious", noting that the "pace is funereal, the dubbed dialogue is more risible than unnerving, and an already confused narrative is made virtually impenetrable by the director's penchant for inserting flashbacks at arbitrary intervals."

From retrospective reviews, Curti felt that with a better director, the story might have worked better, overcoming weak acting and a muddled script. In Phil Hardy and Tom Milne's The Encyclopedia of Horror Movies, a review described the film as a "slow, laboured ghost story" Louis Paul described the film as "obscure" in his book on Italian Horror film directors and that it was attempting to replicate the Gothic films of the early 1960s but does not end up like those films.

References

Footnotes

Sources

External links
 

Italian drama films
1960s Italian-language films
1960s Italian films